Taste of Excitement is a 1970 British mystery thriller film directed by Don Sharp and starring Eva Renzi, David Buck and Peter Vaughan. It was shot during 1968 on location around Nice on the French Riviera, but not given a general release until 1970. It had an X certificate for violence and brief nudity. In the United States it was released under the alternative title Why Would Anyone Want to Kill a Nice Girl Like You?.

Premise
A series of attempts are made on the life of a young woman.

Cast
Jane Kerrell -	Eva Renzi
Paul Hedley - David Buck
Inspector Malling - Peter Vaughan
Hans Beiber - Paul Hubschmid
Michela - Sophie Hardy
Miss Barrow - Kay Walsh
Mr Breese - Francis Matthews
Dr Forla -	George Pravda
Alfredo Guardi - Peter Bowles
Police Inspector -	Alan Rowe
Mr Camot, French Detective - Alan Barry
French Police Officer - Tom Kempinski
Hotel Proprietor -	Yves Brainville
Receptionist -	Catherine Berg

Production
Taste of Excitement was based on Brian Healey's novel Waiting for a Tiger (1965), the first of a series of thrillers about Paul Hedley. Reviewing the book in the New York Times, Antony Boucher wrote "the action is incessant and well varied."

The film was a co production between Group W and Trio Films.

Sharp says he was approached to make the film by producer George Willoughby, who had been recommended to use the director by John Terry of the National Film Finance Corporation. Sharp says it was "rather a nice thriller" with the original title of The Girl in the Red Mini. The film was being made for television and theatrical release; Westinghouse were providing American finance.

Sharp said it had "quite a nice cast without any big names" but four days before shooting was to begin Westinghouse announced they had done a survey of what had been successful of television that revealed comedy-thrillers rated better than straight thrillers. Accordingly they sent over a writer, Alec Coppel, to turn the film into a comedy. Sharp knew Coppel from Australia before the war and felt "he'd done some good work" but "some time ago". Sharp says Coppel would rewrite "reems of stuff" which the director had to rewrite and cut the night before filming. "You wouldn't believe the chaos and confusion", said Sharp, who says the parts of Peter Bowles and Francis Matthews in particular were greatly reduced.

However Sharp got along very well with the producers, who hired him to make a second film, The Violent Enemy, which would be released before Taste of Excitement.

Peter Bowles wrote in his memoirs that he had clashed with Don Sharp while making an episode of The Avengers but three weeks later Sharp offered the actor a role in Taste of Midnight. Bowles loved making the film because of its location.

Reception
The Monthly Film Bulletin called it "a standard mystery adventure."

References

External links

Taste of Excitement at Letterbox DVD
Taste of Excitement at BFI

1970 films
British crime drama films
1970 crime drama films
1970s thriller films
British thriller films
1970s mystery films
Films directed by Don Sharp
Films based on British novels
Films set in Nice
Films shot in Nice
1970s English-language films
1970s British films